The Lukang Ai Gate is an old gate in Lukang Township, Changhua County, Taiwan.

History
In early days, Lukang experienced many war and rights from people of Quanzhou and Zhangzhou for distinguishing their territory. To maintain safety of the area, local businessmen established the Ai Gate at borders as fortification during reign of Daoguang Emperor of Qing Dynasty in 1839. During night times, people would close the gate to prevent invasion of outsiders.

Architecture
The height of the gate is 3.3 meters and its width is 2.7 meters. It has a 門迎後車 writing on it. It is divided into three types, which are boundary Ai Gate, roadway Ai Gate and Bujiantian Street's Ai Gate.

See also
 List of tourist attractions in Taiwan

References

1839 establishments in Taiwan
Buildings and structures completed in 1839
Buildings and structures in Changhua County
Gates in Taiwan
Tourist attractions in Changhua County